The 1987 European Athletics Indoor Championships were held at Stade Couvert Régional in Liévin, France, on 21 and 22 February 1987.

Medal summary

Men

Women

Medal table

Participating nations

 (7)
 (13)
 (18)
 (1)
 (15)
 (1)
 (16)
 (11)
 (41)
 (25)
 (3)
 (7)
 (24)
 (12)
 (3)
 (13)
 (6)
 (3)
 (1)
 (23)
 (22)
 (14)
 (11)
 (2)
 (38)
 (9)

See also
1987 in athletics (track and field)

External links
 Results - men at GBRathletics.com
 Results - women at GBRathletics.com
 EAA

 
European Athletics Indoor Championships
European Indoor Championships
European Athletics Indoor Championships
International athletics competitions hosted by France
Sport in Pas-de-Calais
European Athletics Indoor Championships